Estrella River is a river of Costa Rica. It flows out of the Cordillera de Talamanca and drains into the Caribbean Sea at Bonifacio about halfway between Limón and Cahuita National Park.

References

External links
 Watershed map

Rivers of Costa Rica